The Cittie of Yorke is a grade II listed public house on London's High Holborn, and is listed in CAMRA's National Inventory of Historic Pub Interiors.  The pub is owned and operated by Samuel Smith's Old Brewery.

Although the current building is a rebuilding of the 1920s, the buildings on this site have been pubs since 1430. Some features include the Henekey's long bar  located in the grand, hall-like back room, a late-Georgian or Regency era triangular metal stove, and Victorian-style cubicles.

The Welsh poet Dylan Thomas penned an impromptu ode to the pub when it was called Henneky's Long Bar. Fred Jarvis, a former general secretary of the National Union of Teachers, found the previously unknown poem in 2014 while going through papers belonging to his late parents-in-law who knew Thomas. The top of the poem reads  "This little song was written in Henneky's Long Bar High Holborn by Dylan Thomas in 1951." Orion Publishing Group planned to include the song in a new edition of collected Thomas poems in October 2014.

References

Grade II listed buildings in the London Borough of Camden
National Inventory Pubs
Grade II listed pubs in London
Pubs in the London Borough of Camden